The Intelligencer and Wheeling News Register are combined daily newspapers under common ownership in Wheeling, West Virginia, and are the flagship publications of Ogden Newspapers.  The Intelligencer is published weekday mornings and Saturdays, while the News-Register is published weekday afternoons and Sundays.

See also
 List of newspapers in West Virginia

Newspapers published in West Virginia
Wheeling, West Virginia